Kaki Thalassa is a Mediterranean port town located in the municipality of Lavreotiki, East Attica, Greece, 30 km southeast of the nation's capital, Athens. A rural town, it had a total population of just 127 according to a 2011 Greek census.

Prior to the 2011 Kallikratis local government reform program, Kaki Thalassa was part of the municipality of Keratea.

Climate

References

Populated places in East Attica
Mediterranean port cities and towns in Greece
Landforms of East Attica
Landforms of Attica
Bays of Greece